The following events occurred in May 1985:

May 1, 1985 (Wednesday)
Willis Reed citing his frustrations with recruiting cheating, resigned as head coach of Creighton University basketball. In his four seasons there he had a record of 52-65 and led Creighton to the 1984 NIT tournament.
Died: 
Sir Basil Arthur, 56, New Zealand politician, Speaker of the New Zealand House of Representatives, of Legionnaires' disease. His death necessitates the Timaru by-election a month later.
Denise Robins, 88, British romance novelist

May 2, 1985 (Thursday)
In the Ontario general election, the Progressive Conservatives fail to win an overall majority. Incumbent Premier Frank Miller briefly remains in power while other parties negotiate a coalition.
Born: Lily Allen, English singer, in Hammersmith, the daughter of Keith Allen and Alison Owen

May 3, 1985 (Friday)
Aeroflot Flight 8381, a Tupolev Tu-134 with 79 people on board, collides with a Soviet Air Forces Antonov An-26 with 15 people on board, at 13,000 feet (3,962 m) near Zolochev in the Ukrainian SSR. All 94 people are killed, in an accident attributed to air traffic control errors.
Died: Alari Lindmäe, 17, Estonian table-tennis player; Nikolai Dmitrijev, 53, one of the Soviet Union's most decorated civil airline pilots; Alexander Aksinin, 35, Soviet artist; all killed in the crash of Aeroflot Flight 8381.

May 4, 1985 (Saturday)
The 30th Eurovision Song Contest, held in Gothenburg, Sweden, is won by the Norwegian entry, La det swinge, performed by Bobbysocks!.
The first of the year's two lunar eclipses is observed.

May 5, 1985 (Sunday)
Bitburg controversy: U.S. President Ronald Reagan and West German Chancellor Helmut Kohl attend a funeral service at a cemetery in Bitburg, Germany. The visit, intended to commemorate the 40th anniversary of the end of the Second World War in Europe, arouses criticism in the United States and worldwide because 49 of the 2,000 German soldiers buried at the site were members of the Waffen-SS.
The 1985 San Marino Grand Prix is held at the Imola Circuit. Alain Prost is disqualified and Ayrton Senna begins the race in pole position, but the winner is Elio de Angelis.

May 6, 1985 (Monday)
Died: Pete Desjardins, 78, US Olympic diver

May 7, 1985 (Tuesday)
Born: J Balvin, reggaeton singer, in Medellín, Colombia

May 8, 1985 (Wednesday)
In the first leg of the UEFA Cup Final, Real Madrid CF defeat MOL Vidi FC of Hungary 3–0. 
Two communications satellites, "Telecom 1B" (France Télécom) and "GStar 1" (GTE Spacenet) are successfully launched from the Guiana Space Centre in South America.
Died: Tom Hooson, 52, Welsh MP; his death results in a by-election in the marginal seat of Brecon & Radnor

May 9, 1985 (Thursday)
The US barge Shirley Ann, loaded with discarded tires, is scuttled to act as an artificial reef in the North Atlantic Ocean off Harvey Cedars, New Jersey, United States.

May 10, 1985 (Friday)
The retired US ferry Zeeliner is scuttled to act as an artificial reef in the North Atlantic Ocean off Fire Island south of Long Island, New York, United States.

May 11, 1985 (Saturday)
Bradford City stadium fire: A wooden stand at the Valley Parade stadium, home of soccer club Bradford F.C., catches fire during a match, resulting in 56 deaths and more than 250 injuries.
María Gracia Galleno wins the Miss Perú 1985 title and the right to represent Peru in the Miss Universe competition.

May 12, 1985 (Sunday)
The 1985 Vuelta a España cycle race ends in a win for Spanish rider Pedro Delgado of the Orbea cycling team.
In the 1985 Tuscan regional election, the Italian Communist Party wins 46.2% of the vote and 25 of the 50 seats. After the election Gianfranco Bartolini forms a new government with the support of the Italian Socialist Party and the Italian Democratic Socialist Party.
In Manila, Philippines, the Manila Light Rail Transit System Line 1, the first rapid transit line in Southeast Asia, begins full commercial operations with the opening of the section from Central Terminal Station up to Monumento Station.
Died: Jean Dubuffet, 83, French painter and sculptor

May 13, 1985 (Monday)
An armed standoff between members of the MOVE organization and officers of the Philadelphia Police Department at MOVE's house in Cobbs Creek, Philadelphia, Pennsylvania, United States, a Pennsylvania State Police ends after a helicopter drops two 1-pound (0.45-kg) bombs made of water gel explosive on a fortified cubicle on the roof of the house. The resultant fire destroys the MOVE house, killing 11 occupants, and spreads, destroying about 65 houses.
A general election in the Canadian territory of Yukon results in the election of a minority government led by Tony Penikett.
The US fishing vessel Arctic Mist capsizes and sinks in the Gulf of Alaska east of Kodiak, Alaska. The boat's four occupants are rescued.

May 14, 1985 (Tuesday)
• The last tractor rolls off the assembly line at International Harvester's Farmall plant in Rock Island Illinois, it being a 5488 with front wheel assist.

May 15, 1985 (Wednesday)
In the 1985 Northern Ireland local elections, the Ulster Unionist Party wins 29% of the vote and the Democratic Unionist Party, under Ian Paisley, wins 24.3%.

May 16, 1985 (Thursday)
Scientists from the British Antarctic Survey announce the discovery of a hole in the ozone layer.
The 1985 Giro d'Italia cycle race begins in Palermo, Sicily.
The 11-gross register ton US-registered seiner Anna O runs aground on Softuk Bar, Controller Bay, Alaska, while towing a gillnet fishing vessel Head and Tails. The Anna O is lost, resulting in the death of the only person aboard.

May 17, 1985 (Friday)
Born:
 Derek Hough, American dancer, choreographer and musician, in Salt Lake City
 Christine Nesbitt, Canadian speed skater, to a Canadian father and an Australian mother in Melbourne, Australia

May 18, 1985 (Saturday)
The 1985 Italian Open tennis tournament concludes, with Yannick Noah winning the Men's Singles competition.
The Scottish Cup Final is held at Hampden Park in Glasgow and is won by Celtic F.C., who defeat Dundee United F.C. 2–1. In the FA Cup Final on the same day at Wembley Stadium in England, Manchester United F.C. defeat Everton F.C. 1–0.

May 19, 1985 (Sunday)
The 1985 Monaco Grand Prix is held at the Circuit de Monaco and is won by Alain Prost.
A solar eclipse is observed over north Canada and Greenland.
The 1985 German motorcycle Grand Prix is won by French rider Christian Sarron at the Hockenheimring.
US naval officer John Anthony Walker Jr. is observed by the FBI in the act of passing classified naval communications to the Soviet Union, and is immediately arrested.

May 20, 1985 (Monday)
In Australia, Queensland police raid a number of abortion clinics, including the Greenslopes Fertility Clinic, Brisbane, and seize thousands of patient files.  The search warrant is later ruled invalid and the files are returned.  
The US fishing vessel Kimberly sinks in the Bering Sea northwest of Dutch Harbor, Alaska, resulting in one death; the other four crew members are rescued.

May 21, 1985 (Tuesday)
Born: Mark Cavendish, a road cyclist, in Douglas, Isle of Man, United Kingdom.

May 22, 1985 (Wednesday)
A car bomb in Beirut, the capital of Lebanon, kills 48 people.
The second leg of the UEFA Cup Final, MOL Vidi FC of Hungary defeat Real Madrid CF of Spain 1–0. Real Madrid thus win the competition 3–1 on aggregate.
The US fishing vessel Polar Storm burns and sinks in the Gulf of Alaska northeast of Kodiak. Its four-man crew are rescued by another US fishing vessel, Trident.

May 23, 1985 (Thursday)
US engineer Thomas Patrick Cavanaugh is sentenced to life in prison for attempting to sell stealth bomber secrets to the Soviet Union.

May 24, 1985 (Friday)
The 43rd annual DFB-Pokal football competition begins in Germany.

May 25, 1985 (Saturday)
The 1985 Rous Cup football match between Scotland and England takes place at Hampden Park, Glasgow, and is won by Scotland. The only goal is scored by Richard Gough.

May 26, 1985 (Sunday)
The 1985 Indianapolis 500 motor race takes place at the Indianapolis Motor Speedway in the United States. It is won by Danny Sullivan, after an incident that leads to the race being christened the "Spin and Win". 
The 1985 Nations motorcycle Grand Prix, held at the Mugello Circuit in Italy, is won by Freddie Spencer of the United States.

May 27, 1985 (Monday)

May 28, 1985 (Tuesday)
The India-registered bulk carrier SS Maratha Transhipper is driven ashore and wrecked at Mormugao, Goa.

May 29, 1985 (Wednesday)
Heysel Stadium disaster: At the Heysel Stadium in Brussels, Belgium, 39 people, mostly Italian, are killed during a stampede prior to the 1985 European Cup Final between Juventus F.C. and Liverpool F.C. English football hooligans are deemed mainly responsible for the occurrence, resulting in English clubs being banned from European competition for five years. Several top officials, police captain Johan Mahieu, and 14 Liverpool fans are eventually convicted of manslaughter.

May 30, 1985 (Thursday)

May 31, 1985 (Friday)
1985 United States–Canada tornado outbreak: A tornado outbreak occurs in the US states of Ohio, Pennsylvania, New York, and the Canadian province of Ontario. Fourteen of the 44 tornadoes are in Ontario, where the event becomes known as the Barrie tornado outbreak. In the United States, the only F5 in Pennsylvania history cuts through Niles, Ohio and Wheatland. Ninety people lose their lives.

References

1985
1985-05
1985-05